Jaago Bahey is a Bangladeshi anthology historical drama streaming television series created by Siddiq Ahmed and Sukorno Shahed Dhiman for Chorki. It premiered on 9 December 2021 and ran for three episodes, concluding on 23 December 2021.

Premise
Jaago Bahey is a historical drama anthology television series based on some important events in pre-independent Bangladesh. The first episode, Shobder Khowab, is based on the Bengali language movement in 1952. The second episode, Lights, Camera... Objection has framed the political tension between East Pakistan (later Bangladesh) and the West (later Pakistan) in 1970 through a Bengali filmmaker and a General of the Military regime of Pakistan. The last episode of the series, Bunker Boy, is based on the fight between Mukti Bahini and Pakistan Army during the Bangladesh Liberation War in 1971.

Cast

Episode 1 - Shobder Khowab
 Chanchal Chowdhury as Illyas
 Farhana Hamid as Illyas's wife
 Lutfur Rahman George as Boss
 A K Azad Shetu as Altaf
 Khalid Mahbub Turjo as Iqbal

Episode 2 - Lights, Camera…Objection
 Mostafa Monwar as Zahir Raihan
 Intekhab Dinar as Maj. Gen. Rao Farman Ali
 Aparna Ghosh
 Gazi Rakayet
 Ashoke Bepari
 Kazi Delowar Hemonto
 Apurba Majumder
 Mir Naufel Ashrafi Jisan as Amjad Hossain

Episode 3 - Bunker Boy
 Abdullah Al Sentu

Episodes

Release
Jaago Bahey debuted on 9 December 2021, releasing weekly on Thursdays and consists of 3 episodes.

Reception
Panos Kotzathanasis of Asian Movie Plus wrote: "the quality of the series is definitely much above the average TV series, both in context and production values, with the second episode thriving on the first aspect and the third in the second, although the quality is evident in all three". In her review for The Business Standard Fatima Nujhat Quaderi described Jaago Bahey as, "Chorki's new original miniseries 'Jaago Bahey' comes like a breath of fresh air that can teach the new generation about the Liberation War of 1971 that gave birth to the independent nation of Bangladesh".

Awards

References

External links
 Jaago Bahey on Chorki

Chorki original programming
Bengali-language web series
Bangladeshi web series
2021 web series debuts
2021 Bangladeshi television series debuts
2020s Bangladeshi drama television series